Babou Sidiki Barro (born 10 June 1990) is a Qatari born-Ivorian footballer who plays as a winger.

References

Ivorian footballers
Qatari footballers
Al-Sailiya SC players
Al-Rayyan SC players
Al-Khor SC players
Al Ahli SC (Doha) players
Living people
1990 births
Qatar Stars League players
Qatari Second Division players
Association football wingers
Naturalised citizens of Qatar
Ivorian emigrants to Qatar